When Love Comes Down is the first solo studio album from the former Survivor lead singer Jimi Jamison (after the band decided to go on hiatus following lackluster sales of their 1988 Too Hot to Sleep album) released on July 9, 1991 on Scotti Brothers and Top Notch Records. It featured the singles "Taste of Love", "Rock Hard" and the album's title track. The album was anticipated to perform better than Survivor's Too Hot to Sleep but only managed marginal success, featuring a couple singles that appeared in movies and TV series soundtracks.

The album was produced by Shel Talmy, Kenny Mims and Jim Gaines, distributed by RMG and published by Mofo Music BMI. While Jamison was starting to work on his solo career, he was asked to joined Deep Purple at the moment (to replace their iconic frontman Ian Gillan), but his managers and labels wanted him to concentrate his attention on his album and remain available for a possible Survivor reunion.

Track listing

Personnel 

 Jimi Jamison - lead vocals
 Kenny Mims - guitar, backing vocals
 Randy Cantor - keyboards
 David Cochran- bass guitar
 Scott Trammell - drums
 John Roth - Electric guitar

Additional musicians 

 Kim Bullard - grand piano, keyboards
 Teddy Castellucci - electric and acoustic guitars
 Hutch Hutchinson - bass
 Bill Cuomo - keyboards
 Jimmy Davis - guitar, backing vocals
 Carl Dixon - guitar, backing vocals
 Brett Walker - guitar, backing vocals
 Kenny Greenberg - electric guitar 
 Hal McCormack - electric guitar
 John Hampton - tambourine
 Shel Talmy - tambourine
 Craig Krampf - drums
 Tommy Walsh - drums 
 Shawn Lane - guitar
 Steve Mergen - drums, percussion

Popular culture/covers/soundtracks 
The album managed to have a couple of songs on some movies soundtracks and TV series:

"Rock Hard" was featured in the Baywatch episodes, "Nightmare Bay: Part 2". "Taste of Love" appeared in the Baywatch episode "Lifeguards Can't Jump" as well as the 1992 romantic film Jersey Girl.

Jamison covers the song "If You Walk Away" written by Skip Adams & Todd Cerney.

In 1989, Jamison contributed his own version of "Ever Since the World Began," a song Survivor had initially recorded prior to his tenure in the band, to the film Lock Up. He released the CD with a B-Side "Cry Alone" (song from this album) thanks to CBS label.

References 

1991 debut albums
Jimi Jamison albums
Scotti Brothers Records albums